Carroll Rosenwald School is a historical school building located at Rock Hill, York County, South Carolina.

History 

The Carroll Rosenwald School is a three-classroom frame structure located seven miles southwest of Rock Hill in York County. From 1929, the school served the African American community in the Ogden area of York County. It closed its doors permanently in 1954, but a restoration effort began in 2001, and was completed by 2004. It now serves as a place to teach students the Great Depression.

It was one of over 5,300 building built by and for African-American communities.

It was added to the National Register of Historic Places in 2018.

See also 

 Rosenwald School

References

Houses on the National Register of Historic Places in South Carolina
Neoclassical architecture in South Carolina
Houses completed in 1910
Houses in York County, South Carolina
National Register of Historic Places in York County, South Carolina
Schoolhouses in the United States
Three-room schoolhouses
Educational institutions established in 1910
1910 establishments in South Carolina
Schools in York County, South Carolina
School buildings completed in 1910
1954 disestablishments in South Carolina
Educational institutions disestablished in 1954